Big Chute Marine Railway is a patent slip at lock 44 (in the township of Georgian Bay) of the Trent-Severn Waterway in Ontario, Canada. It is the only marine railway (or canal inclined plane) of its kind in North America still in use, and is overseen by federally operated Parks Canada. This railway is vital for those cruising the  Great Loop route.

History 
In 1914, contracts were let to have 3 locks built to connect the Severn River to Georgian Bay at Port Severn, Big Chute, and Swift Rapids. With the start of World War I, however, there was a shortage of manpower and resources. Lock 45 at Port Severn was nearing completion, so it was finished as a small, "temporary" lock. (It remains in use to this day.) The locks at Big Chute and Swift Rapids were not completed, with "temporary" marine railways being built instead. The Swift Rapids Marine Railway was completed in 1919, using the same plans as the Big Chute railway.

In 1921, plans were once again made to build three locks at Big Chute, to be part of a new section of canal which would take boats from Big Chute and rejoin the existing waterway downstream from the Little Chute, avoiding the fast water in the Little Chute. However because of the post-war recession the scheme was put on hold once more, although remains of the beginning of the dams required to maintain the water levels can still be found in the surrounding forest. The 1923 carriage was used up until around 2003, on days of extremely heavy traffic, or as a backup for the new carriage. Although the old carriage is no longer used, it remains on display.

In the 1960s, surveys of the area were done yet again.  The old, outdated Swift Rapids Marine Railway was replaced with a single conventional lock in 1964, and plans were made for a single lock at Big Chute.

Before construction began the sea lamprey, which had been devastating the fishing industry in the Great Lakes, was found in Gloucester Pool—at the bottom of the railway—and plans were put on hold. Several impractical ideas were suggested, but no practical solution could be found. By the end of the 1960s, the old marine railway could not keep up with the amount of boating traffic in the area. Long lines formed at either end of the railway, with waits often being overnight. Research was done to find a way to prevent the migration of the sea lamprey into Lake Couchiching and Lake Simcoe, while still effectively increasing the flow of traffic. A biologist sat at the bottom of the railway for days, checking the bottom of boats that locked through, and finally saw a lamprey attached to the bottom of a boat. The lamprey fell off after less than 6 meters, so the railway was determined to be effective at preventing the sea lamprey's migration. In 1976, it was finally decided that a new, enlarged railway would be built. It cost $3 million to build .

Operation 
Four  electric motors provide traction by cable. In this enlarged version the increased weight is borne on a dual track which keeps the carriage level (the front and back wheels are on different tracks, with the front of the carriage on the upper tracks. The carriage is kept horizontal due to the relative profile of the tracks. Toward the end of travel, the carriage assumes a slight "nose down" attitude as it submerges into the water. Boats rest on the bottom of the carriage, and webbing slings are provided to support boats safely and prevent them from tipping. The old system has been decommissioned by Parks Canada, to conform with modern safety standards, although the old tracks and carriage still remain. The last operation of the old system was in 2003.

See also 
 Patent slip 
 Swift Rapids Marine Railway
Trent-Severn Waterway
 Big Chute on www.ronquieres.org

References

External links 
 Photos 
 Photos 
 Photos 
 Lock 44 - Big Chute Marine Railway

Boat lifts
Canals in Ontario